Team Gallery is a contemporary art gallery located in the SoHo neighborhood of New York City, with an additional project space in Venice, Los Angeles, California. It was founded by José Freire and Lisa Ruyter in 1996. Team has represented such artists as Ryan McGinley, Banks Violette, Cory Arcangel, Sam McKinniss, and Gardar Eide Einarsson.

History
Team was founded by José Freire and artist Lisa Ruyter in 1996. The gallery moved from Chelsea to SoHo in 2006 and opened a second space in the same neighborhood in 2011. In November 2014, Team opened an outpost in Venice, Los Angeles, California, in a domestic space, christened Team Bungalow.

Team places an especial emphasis on artists focused on counterculture and radical politics – such as Gardar Eide Einarsson, Santiago Sierra, Banks Violette and Egan Frantz – as well as artists working in new media such as Cory Arcangel, Parker Ito, and Tabor Robak.

Freire has been the gallery's chief executive officer and director since 2001.

Articles
 Review of Vlassis Caniaris’s ‘Sculptures 1973–74’ The New York Times, October 6, 2011.
 New York Times review of Ryan McGinley’s ‘Everyone Knows This Is Nowhere’ and Catherine Opie’s ‘Girlfriends’ The New York Times, April 13, 2010.
 Art Info on the announcement of the opening of Team’s second location “Art Info”, October 20, 2010.
 The L Magazine on Ryan McGinley’s ‘Everyone Knows This is Nowhere’ The L Magazine, March 19, 2010.

References

External links
 
 New York Magazine’s listing for Team Gallery

Art museums and galleries in Manhattan
Art galleries established in 1996
1996 establishments in New York City
SoHo, Manhattan